Rashod Moulton (born January 1, 1981 in St. Petersburg, Florida) is a former American football cornerback. He was signed by the Jacksonville Jaguars as an undrafted free agent in 2007. He played college football at the Fort Valley State.

Moulton has also been a member of the Denver Broncos.

External links
Denver Broncos bio
Jacksonville Jaguars bio

1981 births
Living people
Players of American football from Florida
American football running backs
American football wide receivers
American football return specialists
American football cornerbacks
American football safeties
Fort Valley State Wildcats football players
Jacksonville Jaguars players
Denver Broncos players